The Whispering Wall is a 2004 album by The Legendary Pink Dots.

Track listing
 Soft Toy
 A Distant Summer
 Dominic
 In Sickness and in Health
 For Sale
 King of a Small World
 The Region Beyond
 06
 Peek-A-Boo
 The Divide
 Sunken Pleasure/Rising Pleasure/No Walls, No Strings

Credits
 The Silverman (Phil Knight): keyboards, electronics
 Edward Ka-Spel: voice, keyboards
 Erik Drost: guitar
 Niels Van Hoornblower: saxophone, clarineta
 Raymond Steeg: sound wizardry

Engineered by Raymond Steeg and The Legendary Pink Dots
Cover by Poppy K. with thanks to Gladys Easystreet and Ramona Stork.

References

The Legendary Pink Dots albums
2004 albums